A table computer, or a table PC, or a tabletop is a device class of a full-featured large-display portable all-in-one computer with an internal battery. It can either be used on a table's top, hence the name, or carried around the house.

Table computers feature an 18-inch or larger multi-touch touchscreen display, a battery capable of at least 2 hours of autonomous work and a full-featured desktop operating system, such as Windows 10. They are typically shipped with pre-installed multi-user touch-enabled casual games and apps, and typically marketed as family entertainment devices. Manufacturers of some table computers provide a specialized graphical user interface to simplify a simultaneous interaction of multiple users, one example is Aura interface, which is installed in Lenovo IdeaCentre Horizon tabletop.

A number of manufacturers released their own versions of tabletops, some prominent examples are HP Envy Rove 20, Dell XPS 18 and Sony VAIO Tap 20.

See also
Surface computer

References

Classes of computers
Portable computers
All-in-one desktop computers